"Airport Song" is the debut single by Guster, from their second album Goldfly. It also appears on the live CD and DVD Guster on Ice.

"Airport Song" received modest radio airplay, peaking at No. 35 on the Billboard Modern Rock chart.

Live performance 
The sounds of a ping pong game can be heard during the outro of the song. A Guster fan tradition involves throwing ping pong balls onstage during this part of the song when played live.  Another aspect of live performances includes a pitch change on Miller's vocal mic to cause a sort of demonic effect.  Furthermore, the band plays a disco dance groove to extend the song to roughly six minutes.

References 

Guster songs
1998 debut singles
1998 songs